The 2013 Abierto Mexicano Telcel was a professional tennis tournament played on outdoor clay courts. It was the 20th edition of the men's tournament (13th for the women), and part of the 2013 ATP World Tour and the 2013 WTA Tour. It took place in Acapulco, Mexico between 25 February and 2 March 2013.

Points and prize money

Point distribution

Prize money

* per team

ATP singles main draw entrants

Seeds

1 Rankings as of February 18, 2013.

Other entrants
The following players received wildcards into the main draw:
 Daniel Garza
 César Ramírez
 Miguel Ángel Reyes-Varela

The following players received entry from the qualifying draw:
 Martín Alund
 Dušan Lajović
 Wayne Odesnik
 Diego Schwartzman

The following player received entry as lucky loser:
 Antonio Veić

Withdrawals
Before the tournament
 Jérémy Chardy
 Juan Mónaco (hand injury)
 Albert Ramos
 Fernando Verdasco (neck injury)

ATP doubles main draw entrants

Seeds

1 Rankings as of February 18, 2013.

Other entrants
The following pairs received wildcards into the main draw:
 Miguel Gallardo Valles /  César Ramírez
 Daniel Garza /  Miguel Ángel Reyes-Varela
The following pair received entry as alternates:
 Potito Starace /  Filippo Volandri

Withdrawals
Before the tournament
 Jérémy Chardy
 Albert Ramos
 Fernando Verdasco (neck injury)

WTA singles main draw entrants

Seeds

1 Rankings as of February 18, 2013.

Other entrants
The following players received wildcards into the main draw:
 Ximena Hermoso
 Francesca Schiavone
 Ajla Tomljanović

The following players received entry from the qualifying draw:
 Eugenie Bouchard
 Catalina Castaño
 María José Martínez Sánchez
 Grace Min

The following player received entry as a lucky loser:
 Sharon Fichman

Withdrawals
Before the tournament
 Sofia Arvidsson
 Edina Gallovits-Hall
 Polona Hercog
 Arantxa Rus (gastrointestinal illness)
 Anna Tatishvili
 Vera Zvonareva (shoulder injury)

Retirements
 Irina-Camelia Begu
 María Teresa Torró Flor

WTA doubles main draw entrants

Seeds

1 Rankings as of February 18, 2013.

Other entrants
The following pairs received wildcards into the main draw:
 Ximena Hermoso /  Ana Sofía Sánchez
 Victoria Rodríguez /  Marcela Zacarías

Finals

Men's singles

  Rafael Nadal defeated  David Ferrer, 6–0, 6–2

Women's singles

 Sara Errani defeated  Carla Suárez Navarro, 6–0, 6–4

Men's doubles

 Łukasz Kubot /  David Marrero defeated  Simone Bolelli /  Fabio Fognini, 7–5, 6–2

Women's doubles

 Lourdes Domínguez Lino /  Arantxa Parra Santonja defeated  Catalina Castaño /  Mariana Duque Mariño, 6–4, 7–6(7–1)

References

External links
Official Website